Lists of clans of Celtic peoples include:

 List of Scottish clans
 List of Irish clans

Lists of modern Indo-European tribes and clans